Carlos Baleba (born 3 January 2004) is a Cameroonian professional footballer who plays for French Ligue 1 club Lille.

Early life
Carlos Baleba was born on 3 January 2004 in Douala, Cameroon. He grew up in Akwa neighbourhood and is of Bassa descent. His father is a former professional footballer who played in South Africa and Cameroon.

Club career 
Baleba started playing football at Futur Soccer FC in Douala and then joined École de Football des Brasseries du Cameroun academy center at the age of 13. He was transferred to Lille in January 2022, since he had already attracted the scouts of several other European clubs. Having arrived in the Nord along with other youngster Joffrey Bazié, the two Africans first joined Lille's reserve team, that played in National 3 that season.

Having made a few appearences on the bench without making his professional debut, during the late stages of the 2021–22 Ligue 1 season, Baleba really became part of the first team during the following pre-season, impressing newly appointed manager Paulo Fonseca.

He made his professional debut for Lille on the 7 August 2022, replacing Angel Gomes during a 4–1 Ligue 1 win against Auxerre.

Style of play
Known for his stamina, dribbling and passing range, Baleba is a complete and powerful central midfielder who can play in a box-to-box role or as a holding midfielder. He grew up idolizing Paul Pogba, Kevin De Bruyne, Thiago Alcântara as well as Nicolas Pépé and Idrissa Gueye.

References

External links

2004 births
Living people
Footballers from Douala
Cameroonian footballers
Association football midfielders
Lille OSC players
Ligue 1 players
Championnat National 3 players
Cameroonian expatriate footballers
Cameroonian expatriates in France
Expatriate footballers in France